Margret Dieck (July 1941 – 28 November 1996) was a German gerontologist and is considered one of the country's distinguished representatives of gerontology, especially of the socio-politico-scientific orientation. She is one of the most important members of the “Kölner Schule” in gerontology, whose credo is the “Lebenslagekonzept” (circumstance concept) – a concept for explaining, describing and evaluating living conditions of population groups, implementing material as well as immaterial characteristics. One further aim of this school is to identify the living situation of socially deprived and endangered population groups and, based on that, to offer propositions for improvement.

Biography 
Margret Dieck is born in Bad Godesberg, a district of Bonn. She grows up in a doctor's family. After finishing school, Dieck studies economic and social sciences in Cologne, and finishes her studies as a diploma economist. Her first job is an academic associate's position at the “Forschungsinstitut für Einkommenspolitik und Soziale Sicherung“ (research institute for incomes policy and social security) in Cologne. Her first scientific works are on the theory of social regulation, social cybernetics and on the economical theory of the statutory health insurance.
In 1966, Dieck changes to an academic assistant's position at the “Forschungsstätte für öffentliche Unternehmen“ (research institution for public enterprises) at the University of Cologne. There, she soon assumes as well the business operations. After only one year, in 1967, she changes again, to an academic associate's position at the “Seminar für Sozialpolitik und Genossenschaftswesen“ (seminar for social policy and cooperative system), that is as well part of the University of Cologne. This Seminar is led by Gerhard Weisser and, later, Otto Blume: those two teachers who probably influence Dieck's work the most. In this period, Margret Dieck concerns herself inter alia with financing and the promotion of public enterprises and with the economic operating of labour unions. Dieck achieves the title “Dr. rer. pol.” (Doctor rerum politicarum – Doctor of political and economic sciences) in the same year.
The young academic is early concerned with the living situation of weak and endangered persons – partly motivated by the respective preliminary work of Gerhard Weisser and Otto Blume. The results of the latter on questions of the living situation of elder people are the basis for Dieck's special interest in the social subjects of gerontology. This interest makes her change to the “Kuratorium Deutsche Altershilfe” (KDA, curatorship of German seniority age) in 1969. She initiates there the foundation of an institute for senior housing, which she academically leads from 1970 on, and until she leaves for the „Deutsches Zentrum für Altersfragen e.V.“ (DZA, German centre for aging questions) in 1974.
In her KDA time, Dieck can note some considerable achievements: She is engaged in a survey report on the stationary treatment of aging illnesses and on cost absorption by statutory health insurances, published in 1974. This survey is a directory for experts then and now, and 1995/96 – 20 years later – becomes the basis for the rearrangement of covering in case of care dependency. Furthermore, she contributes to a DGB (“Deutscher Gewerkschaftsbund” – German Trade Union Federation) survey on the “Lebenslage älterer Menschen von 1975” (living situation of the elderly, published in 1975). This document is the first extensive socio-politico-scientific analysis of the elderlies' living conditions in the German Federal Republic. It proves a new orientation in the labour unions' social policy of that time.
As written before, Dieck changes to the “Deutschen Zentrum für Altersfragen e.V.” (DZA) in 1974. In her time there, she works initially as a divisional director for applied research and academic advice. In 1977, she becomes academic director of the DZA. Dieck remains in this position until she dies. The DZA advances under her guidance to one of the leading socio-politico-scientific research and documentation centres in Germany. For many, the name “Margret Dieck” becomes a synonym for the DZA. One considerable achievement of this time is a three-volume report on “Altwerden in Deutschland” (Aging in Germany), that is written by the “Arbeitsgruppe Fachbericht über Probleme des Alterns” (working group for the report on the problems of aging) under her academic aegis and published in 1982.
On 28 November 1996, Margret Dieck dies after a short, heavy illness.

Work 
Almost all of Margret Dieck's academic work concerns the topic of social disequilibria in seniority, what means: with the socially disadvantaged groups of the elderly. Her focus is not only to analyse, but to reach policy and society, and thus go beyond theory and to provide bases for implementation. Dieck's scientific aims are...
...to bring the social protection and security of the elderly on one level and on the same standards with the social protection of all other population groups. This aim provokes, inter alia, her engagement for the nursing care insurance and, eventually, for the financing of social services.
...to fight and to overcome the reasons and causes of social distress and of under-supply (so-called “social weakness”) of the problematic seniority groups.
...to put constant effort in influencing policy and society, to let theory become practice.
...to strengthen the socio-politico-economic positions and ideas of the gerontological community in Germany. Concerning this, Dieck is occasionally blunt, sometimes even harsh in her diction. But she is always convinced of her concern's eligibility, being the social policy.
...to indirectly, and partly as well directly, represent the interests of those members of seniority, whose interests are only insufficiently observed.
One important work beneath the already mentioned is “Sozialpolitik für ältere Menschen” (Social Policy for the Elderly), published together with Gerhard Naegele in 1978: This work is considered the programmatic foundation of a socio-politico-scientific research area in the social gerontology. Another one is “Wohnen und Wohnumfeld älterer Menschen in der Bundesrepublik”, on living conditions of the elderly in Germany, published in 1979. This monography is considered a benchmark of gerontological literature until today.
Further publications of Dieck are on
– women and aging,
– family relations in higher age,
– sanitary and custodial care of the elderly,
– poverty and wealth in higher age,
– elderly employees,
– retirement and work-related “disposal” in higher age,
– nursing care insurance,
– social services and their financing.

Honorary work 
Though being very much engaged in her jobs, Margret Dieck finds always some spare time for honorary work. For several years, she is – together with Siegfried Gößling – chairman of the department VI of the German Society for Gerontology. From 1984 to 1986, she holds the position of its vice president, together with Ursula Lehr and Ingeborg Falck. Furthermore, Dieck is member of the expert committee on senior citizen policy of the AWO (“Arbeiterwohlfahrt” – Workers' Welfare Association) Federal Association. She is involved in the development of the 2nd seniority plan of the Federal State of Nordrhein-Westfalen and in the surveys on which this plan is based. She is member of the expert committee for the development of the first aging report of the Bundesregierung (German government) and expert in the investigation commission “Demographischer Wandel” (demographic change) of the German Bundestag (parliament). And she is member of the curatorship and the academic advisory board of the German research company for gerontology.

Publications 
Arbeitsgruppe Fachbericht über Probleme des Alterns (1982): Altwerden in der Bundesrepublik Deutschland: Geschichte – Situationen – Perspektiven. Beiträge zur Gerontologie und Altenarbeit; 40/I-III. Berlin: DZA-Eigenverlag.
Backes, G./Dieck, M./Naegele, G. (1985): Ziele und Grundsätze einer modernen Altenpolitik. In: Theorie und Praxis der sozialen Arbeit; 12; S. 410–418.
Dieck, M. (1979): Wohnen und Wohnumfeld älterer Menschen in der Bundesrepublik. Heidelberg: Quelle & Meyer.
Dieck, M. (1991): Altenpolitik. In: Oswald, W.D. et al. (Hg.): Gerontologie. 2. Auflage. Stuttgart, Berlin, Köln: Kohlhammer; S. 23–37.
Dieck, M./Naegele, G. (Hg.) (1978): Sozialpolitik für ältere Menschen. Heidelberg: Quelle & Meyer.
Dieck, M./Naegele, G. (1989): Die neuen Alten – Soziale Ungleichheiten vertiefen sich. In: Karlf, F./Tokarski, W. (Hg.): Die “neuen” Alten. Beiträge der XVII. Jahrestagung der Deutschen Gesellschaft für Gerontologie, Kassel 22–24.09.1988. Kasseler Gerontologische Schriften; 6. Kassel: Gesamthochschulbibliothek; S. 167–181.
Dieck, M./Naegele, G. (1993): “Neue Alte” und alte soziale Ungleichheiten – Vernachlässigte Dimensionen in der Diskussion des Altersstrukturwandels. In: Naegele, G./Twes, H.P. (Hg.): Lebenslagen im Strukturwandel des Alters. Opladen: Westdeutscher Verlag; S. 43–60.
Kuratorium Deutsche Altershilfe (KDA) (1974): Gutachten über die stationäre Behandlung von Krankheiten im Alter und über die Kostenübernahme durch die gesetzlichen Krankenkassen. Köln: KDA-Eigenverlag.
Wirtschafts- und Sozialwissenschaftliches Institut des Deutschen Gewerkschaftsbundes (WSI) (1975): Die Lebenslage älterer Menschen in der Bundesrepublik Deutschland. Analyse der Mängel und Vorschläge zur Verbesserung. Köln: Bund-Verlag.

References 

1941 births
1996 deaths
German gerontologists
Physicians from Bonn
Women medical researchers